James Thorne (1795–1872), was an English Methodist preacher, leader of the Arminian Bible Christian Church and editor of the Bible Christian Magazine.

Biography 
James Thorne was born at North Furze Farm, Shebbear, Devonshire, on 21 Sept. 1795. He was the son of John Thorne, farmer, by his wife, Mary Ley, daughter of a farmer in the neighbouring parish of Bradford. On 9 Oct. 1815 the Society of Bible Christians was formed by William O'Bryan. Among its members were John and Mary Thorne, with their five children.

James, who was known among his companions as "a lad o' pairts," rapidly acquired a position of pre-eminence among his associates. He almost immediately began preaching, and for four years continued to journey throughout the various parts of Devonshire. The effect of his labours was very great. When he began preaching the Bible Christians were twenty-two in number. At the end of four years they were numerous in many parts of Devonshire.

Thorne endured many hardships and much actual persecution, though his eloquence and earnestness generally disarmed opposition when he could obtain a hearing. In 1820 he visited Kent, where he also met with considerable success, and aided in founding several congregations of "Arminian Bible Christians." In 1824 he was sent to London, where he placed the congregation in a prosperous condition, and in 1825 he again visited Kent as a missionary.

From 1817 onwards Thorne was also foremost in the work of founding chapels for his co-religionists both in Devonshire and Kent. The first chapel was finished at Shebbear in 1818, and three more were built by his exertions in Kent by 1821. From 1827 to 1829 he was superintendent preacher of the Shebbear circuit, from 1830 to 1831 he filled the same office in Kilkhampton, and in 1831 he presided over the general conference of Bible Christians.

From this time onwards until 1844 he was chiefly occupied in journeying through Southern England, organising the society, and forming local congregations in various districts. Thorne was fitted for evangelical work by a ready wit and considerable dialectical skill, which stood him in good stead in controversy. He was no less aided by the fascination of his discourses, which rendered indifference impossible. In the after work of building up congregations his counsels were always on the side of prudence, without discountenancing enterprise. Labouring among people of small means, he deprecated building chapels with a heavy debt attached.

In addition to his other duties Thorne shared in the pastoral work in the circuit of Shebbear, and after the resignation of William O'Bryan in September 1828, he became editor of the Bible Christian Magazine, continuing in that office until 1866, when he was succeeded by F. W. Bourne.

In 1844 he settled at Shebbear, and confined himself more to local work, though still undertaking frequent mission tours. In 1870 failing health compelled him to relinquish his "connexional duties," and to restrict himself simply to preaching. He removed to Plymouth, where he died on 28 Jan. 1872, and was buried at Shebbear.

He was without doubt by far the ablest man among the early Bible Christians. On 23 Sept. 1823 he married Catherine Reed of Holwell, by whom he had six children. Portraits of Thorne are prefixed to the memoirs of 1873 and 1895.

Notes and references

Citations

Sources

Further reading 
 Bourne's Centenary Life of James Thorne, 1895
 Memoirs of James Thorne by his Son, 1873

1795 births
1872 deaths
19th-century Methodist ministers
Arminian ministers
Arminian writers
English Methodist ministers
Methodist writers